Antoine River may refer to:

 Antoine River (Arkansas), tributary of the Little Missouri River in Arkansas, United States
 Antoine River (Grenada), flows to the Caribbean sea
 Antoine River (Quebec), a river in Quebec